Floyd County Courthouse may refer to:

Floyd County Courthouse (Georgia), listed on the National Register of Historic Places (NRHP)
Floyd County Courthouse (Iowa), listed on the NRHP